William Pulteney, Viscount Pulteney (9 January 1731 – 12 February 1763) was a British Whig politician and soldier.

Early life

He was the only son of William Pulteney, 1st Earl of Bath and his wife Anna Maria Gumley, daughter of John Gumley. Pulteney was educated at Westminster School from 1740 to 1747 and began his Grand Tour in the following year. He traveled with John Douglas first to Leipzig, met his parents in Paris in 1749 and went then to Turin.

Career

In 1754, he entered the British House of Commons, sitting for Old Sarum until 1761. Subsequently, he represented Westminster as Member of Parliament (MP) until his death in 1763. Pulteney was appointed Lord of the Bedchamber in 1760 and served as Aide-de-Camp to King George III of the United Kingdom between January and February 1763.

In 1759, his father raised the 85th Regiment of Foot and Pulteney became its lieutenant-colonel. He took part with his regiment in the Capture of Belle Île in February 1761 and moved in November to Portugal. On his return to England in 1763, he died of fever in Madrid, unmarried and childless and was buried in Westminster Abbey two months later. His father died only a year later and the titles became extinct.

References

1731 births
1763 deaths
85th Regiment of Foot (Royal Volunteers) officers
British courtesy viscounts
British MPs 1754–1761
British MPs 1761–1768
Heirs apparent who never acceded
Members of the Parliament of Great Britain for English constituencies
People educated at Westminster School, London